Galaxy 25 (G-25) launched in 1997, the launch was contracted by International Launch Services (ILS), (formerly known as Intelsat Americas 5 (IA-5) until 15 February 2007 when it was renamed as result of the merger between owner Intelsat and PanAmSat or Telstar 5) is a medium-powered communications satellite formerly in a geostationary orbit at 97° West, above a point in the Pacific Ocean several hundred miles west of the Galapagos Islands. It was manufactured by Space Systems/Loral, part of its LS-1300 satellite bus, and is currently owned and operated by Intelsat. The satellite's main C-band transponder cluster covers the United States, Canada, and Mexico; its main Ku-band transponder cluster covers the United States, Mexico, and the Northern Caribbean Sea. An additional C-band and a Ku-band transponder pair targets Hawaii.

Galaxy 25 has a projected life of 12 years. It was replaced by Galaxy 19 (formerly IA-9) in late 2008. When it was last in service at 97.1° West, Galaxy 25 transmitted both Free-to-air (FTA) direct-to-home (DTH) broadcasting and encrypted subscription channels / services. The replacement satellite, Galaxy 19 was successfully launched on September 24, 2008. Galaxy 25 has been moved to a different orbital position at 93.1° West where it is currently broadcasting several services on its Ku band transponders.

Technical details

Platform operators 
The Ku-Band side of the satellite carried the platforms of Pittsburgh International Telecommunications, Inc (PIT), Globecast, RRSat, and ABS-CBN, with free-to-air and encrypted television and radio programming in a variety of languages:

See also 
 FTA Receiver

References

External links 
 RRsat website
 Intelsat website
 Pittsburgh International Telecommunications Information
 Channels carried on Galaxy 25 (Lyngsat)
 Globecast website

Communications satellites in geostationary orbit
Satellite television
Spacecraft launched in 1997
Satellites using the SSL 1300 bus